Boomeranger may refer to:

 Boomeranger, Trove (video game) character
 Boomerang Generation synonym